The Sampson-class destroyers served in the United States Navy during World War I. Commissioned in 1916 and 1917, the class was a modification of the  and es, with the number of  torpedo tubes increased from four twin-mounts to four triple-mounts. The Sampsons were the final six ships of the 26 "thousand tonner" destroyers. They were the largest and most heavily armed of the "thousand tonners", and the subsequent "flush deck" classes differed mainly in hull design and the engineering plant.

Design

Armament
While the gun armament was typical for destroyers of this period, the torpedo armament of twelve 21 inch (533 mm) torpedo tubes was a significant increase over the preceding Tucker class, replacing four twin mounts with four triple mounts. Both the gun and torpedo armament would remain standard through the mass-production "flush-deck"  and es commissioned through 1921. As with the other "thousand tonners", a factor in the size of the torpedo armament was the General Board's decision to use broadside rather than centerline torpedo tubes. This was due to the desire to have some torpedoes remaining after firing a broadside, and problems experienced with centerline mounts on previous classes with torpedoes striking the gunwales of the firing ship. The Mark 8 torpedo was equipped.

This was the first US destroyer class to mount anti-aircraft guns: two 1 pounder (37 mm) autocannons. Anti-submarine (ASW) armament was added during World War I. Typically, a single depth charge track was provided aft, along with a Y-gun depth charge projector.

Engineering

Service
The Sampson class served in World War I as convoy escorts in the Atlantic. Wilkes and Shaw served in the United States Coast Guard as part of the Rum Patrol 1926-34. While the other ships of the Sampson class were retired and scrapped 1934-36 to comply with the London Naval Treaty, Allen survived into the 1940s and served through World War II before being decommissioned and scrapped, the only pre-flush-deck destroyer to serve in that war.

Ships in class

References

Citations

Sources
 

 Silverstone, Paul H., U.S. Warships of World War I (Ian Allan, 1970), .
 Silverstone, Paul H., U.S. Warships of World War II (Ian Allan, 1965), .
 Gardiner, Robert, Conway's All the World's Fighting Ships 1906-1921, London: Conway Maritime Press, 1985. .
 Gardiner, Robert and Chesneau, Roger, Conway's All the World's Fighting Ships 1922-1946, London: Conway Maritime Press, 1980. .

External links

Tin Can Sailors @ Destroyers.org - Sampson class
USS Rowan Reunion Association
DestroyerHistory.org Thousand Tonner page
DestroyerHistory.org Sampson Class page
NavSource Destroyer Photo Index Page
DiGiulian, Tony Navweaps.com 4"/50 Mks 7, 8, 9, and 10
DiGiulian, Tony Navweaps.com Pre-WWII US Torpedoes
US Navy Torpedo History, part 2 

Destroyer classes